Nicolas Falacci is a television writer and producer. Along with his wife and writing partner Cheryl Heuton, he co-created the television series Numb3rs (2005).  Falacci and Heuton won the 2005 Carl Sagan Award for Public Understanding of Science award for the show's popularization of mathematics.  Falacci also wrote the story and screenplay for the 1991 horror film Children of the Night, starring Karen Black and Peter DeLuise.

Filmography
 Children of the Night (1991), writer
 Numb3rs (2005), writer and producer
 The Arrangement (2013), writer and producer

References

External links
 

Year of birth missing (living people)
Living people
American television writers
American male television writers
American television producers
American skeptics
American writers of Italian descent